Almir Aganspahić (born 12 September 1996) is a Bosnian professional footballer who plays as a forward for Serbian SuperLiga club Novi Pazar.

Honours
Sarajevo
Bosnian Cup: 2013–14

References

External links
Almir Aganspahić at Sofascore

1996 births
Living people
Footballers from Sarajevo
Association football forwards
Bosnia and Herzegovina footballers
Bosnia and Herzegovina youth international footballers
Bosnia and Herzegovina under-21 international footballers
FK Sarajevo players
NK Osijek players
Raufoss IL players
FK Mladost Doboj Kakanj players
FK Krupa players
NK Čelik Zenica players
FK Novi Pazar players
Premier League of Bosnia and Herzegovina players
Croatian Football League players
Norwegian First Division players
Serbian SuperLiga players
Bosnia and Herzegovina expatriate footballers
Expatriate footballers in Croatia
Bosnia and Herzegovina expatriate sportspeople in Croatia
Expatriate footballers in Norway
Bosnia and Herzegovina expatriate sportspeople in Norway
Expatriate footballers in Serbia
Bosnia and Herzegovina expatriate sportspeople in Serbia